Kalo Chorio Larnakas (literally 'Good Village') is a village located in the Larnaca District of Cyprus, 10 km west of the town of Larnaca. Prior to 1974, the majority of the village consisted of Turkish Cypriots.

References

Communities in Larnaca District
Turkish Cypriot villages depopulated after the 1974 Turkish invasion of Cyprus